OSF HealthCare is a not-for-profit Catholic health care organization that operates a medical group, hospital system, and other health care facilities in Illinois and Michigan.  Headquartered in Peoria, Illinois, OSF HealthCare is owned and operated by the Sisters of the Third Order of St. Francis.

History
The Sisters of the Third Order of St. Francis were founded in Peoria on July 16, 1877, by Mother M. Frances Krasse, O.S.F., and Bishop John Lancaster Spalding.

Property was obtained in 1877 for St. Francis Hospital, which is the present day site of OSF Saint Francis Medical Center. On January 2, 1880, the Sisters of the Third Order of St. Francis not-for-profit corporation was incorporated.

Later that year, St. Joseph's Hospital in Bloomington, Illinois, was established, moving in 1968 to its present site today as OSF St. Joseph Medical Center.

In 1884, five sisters were sent to Escanaba, Michigan, to begin working at Delta County Hospital.  In 1915, the Sisters purchased that hospital and renamed it OSF St. Francis Hospital.

By then, the Sisters were already operating St. Anthony Hospital, which they established in Rockford, Illinois, in 1899. The hospital in Rockford moved in 1963 to a new facility as present day OSF Saint Anthony Medical Center.

1900s: 
The 1900s brought additional hospitals to OSF HealthCare.  St. James Hospital was established in 1907 in Pontiac, Illinois, moving to a new facility in 2002 as present day OSF Saint James-John W. Albrecht Medical Center. St. Mary's Hospital was established in 1909 in Galesburg, Illinois, and moved to a new facility in 1974, where it is today OSF St. Mary Medical Center.

In 1957, the Management Services and Materials Management, now known as Finance and Accounting, Materials Management and Supply Chain divisions, were established. That same year, the Central Administration Office was established, renamed the Corporate Office in 1987 and today is known as Ministry Services.

In 1990, OSF Children's Hospital of Illinois was officially established within OSF Saint Francis Medical Center as a pediatric hospital. Children's Hospital of Illinois is also proud to house the Jim and Trudy Maloof St. Jude Affiliate Clinic, which brings some of the pediatric oncology care and services offered in Memphis to central Illinois.

2000s: 
OSF Home Care Services, a new operating division combining all facility-based home health and hospice services, was brought into operation.

On January 28, 2002, OSF Aviation, LLC, which owns helicopters configured and equipped for patient transport, was organized.

On April 12, 2007, Community Medical Center consolidated its assets with OSF Healthcare System and is known today as OSF Holy Family Medical Center and OSF Holy Family Clinics in Monmouth, Illinois.

On July 23, 2008, the Illinois Neurological Institute – Physicians, LLC was organized to provide professional services of neurosurgeons and other physicians specializing in neurosciences.

On September 1, 2008, HeartCare Midwest, Ltd., was purchased by OSF Healthcare System.

In 2009, Cardiovascular Institute, an OSF LLC, was organized to provide professional services of cardiologists in the Rockford, Illinois, area. Illinois Pathologist Services, LLC, was established in 2009 and on May 28 that same year, OSF Multispecialty Group – Eastern Region, LLC, was organized for specialty physician services in the Bloomington, Illinois, area and Illinois Specialty Physician Services at OSF, LLC, was organized to provide pulmonary medicine physician services in the Peoria area. OSF Perinatal Associates, LLC, was organized to provide maternal fetal medicine physician services in the Peoria area.

In 2010, the OSF Multispecialty Group – Western Region, LLC, was organized for specialty physician services in the Galesburg, Illinois, area. OSF Children's Medical Group – Congenital Heart Center, LLC, was organized to provide pediatric cardiology services in the Rockford, Illinois, area.

The Supportive Care and Employer Services divisions were established in 2011, as was Preferred Emergency Physicians of Illinois, LLC, which provides emergency medicine physician services to various Illinois hospitals. On May 1, 2012, Ottawa Regional Medical Center was integrated with OSF Healthcare System, changing its name to OSF Saint Elizabeth Medical Center.

In 2013, Jump Simulation  was established in partnership with the University of Illinois College of Medicine at Peoria. On April 2, 2014, Kewanee Hospital joined OSF Healthcare System as OSF Saint Luke Medical Center. The following year, OSF HealthCare Saint Paul Medical Center in Mendota, IL became the 11th hospital to join OSF HealthCare.

In 2018, the Ministry welcomed OSF HealthCare Heart of Mary Medical Center in Urbana, IL and OSF HealthCare Sacred Heart Medical Center in Danville, IL. OSF HealthCare Little Company of Mary Medical Center in Evergreen Park, IL, joined the Ministry in 2020 and in 2021, OSF HealthCare added OSF HealthCare Saint Clare Medical Center in Princeton, IL, previously Perry Memorial Hospital. 

In 2021, OSF Healthcare entered a partnership agreement with Kindred Healthcare for transformation and joint-operation of the (Peoria) Kindred Hospital; held a Groundbreaking Ceremony for the $237 million OSF Healthcare Cancer Institute construction upon the flagship (Peoria) OSF St. Francis Medical Center campus; and OSF Healthcare administrators with numerous civic, federal, and state leaders held a Ribbon Cutting ceremony outside it's new Ministry Headquarters building in Downtown Peoria scheduled for move-in and occupancy in January of 2022.

In 2022, OSF Healthcare announced the acquisition of Galesburg Cottage Hospital located in Galesburg, Illinois.

Mission 
In the spirit of Christ and the example of Francis of Assisi, the Mission of OSF HealthCare is to serve persons with the greatest care and love in a community that celebrates the Gift of Life.

Operations 
OSF HealthCare employs nearly 24,000 Mission Partners in more than 145 locations, including 15 hospitals with 2,089 licensed acute care beds - 10 acute care, four critical access and 32 urgent care locations and two colleges of nursing throughout Illinois and Michigan.

The OSF HealthCare physician network employs 1,700 primary care, specialty and advanced practice providers.

OSF HealthCare, through OSF Home Care Services, operates eight home health agencies, eight hospice agencies including an inpatient hospice home, home infusion pharmacy and home medical equipment.

It also owns Pointcore, Inc., composed of health care-related businesses; OSF HealthCare Foundation, the philanthropic arm for the organization; and OSF Ventures, which provides investment capital for promising health care innovation startups.

The Ministry Services office in Peoria provides corporate management services, as well as direction, consultation and assistance to the administration of the health care facilities.

Hospitals

References

Catholic health care
Companies based in Peoria, Illinois
Hospital networks in the United States
Healthcare in Illinois
Healthcare in Michigan
 
1877 establishments in Illinois
Catholic hospital networks in the United States